Denys Sokolovskyi (born 26 March 1979) is a retired Ukrainian professional football player who played for several clubs in Europe, including FC Metalurh Donetsk and FC Vorskla Poltava in the Ukrainian Premier League, Panionios FC in the Greek Superleague and Pogoń Szczecin the Polish Ekstraklasa.

Sokolovskyi had brief stints with clubs in Greece and Poland before returning to Ukraine with FC Vorskla Poltava for the 2002 season.

References

External links
 Profile
 

1979 births
Living people
Ukrainian footballers
Ukrainian expatriate footballers
Expatriate footballers in Greece
Expatriate footballers in Poland
Expatriate footballers in Azerbaijan
FC Metalurh Donetsk players
FC Vorskla Poltava players
Panionios F.C. players
Pogoń Szczecin players
FC Zirka Kropyvnytskyi players
FC Obolon-Brovar Kyiv players
FC Kryvbas Kryvyi Rih players
Association football forwards
Footballers from Donetsk